

German Chileans

Political figures 
Ingrid Antonijevic Hahn, Minister of Economy (2006), academic, businesswoman
Ena von Baer, Independent Democratic Union politician, Minister General Secretary of Government under Pinera government and academic
Edgardo Enríquez Frödden, Minister of Education (1973), naval officer, physician, academic
Carlos Frödden Lorenzen, politician, naval officer
Tomás Hirsch, Humanist Party politician and businessman
Miguel Kast, Former Minister of Odeplan (1978–1980) and Labour (1980–1982), and President of the Central Bank (1982)
Carlos Keller, philosopher, politician
Alejandra Krauss, Christian Democratic Party politician
Jorge González von Marées, fascist politician
Ricardo Lagos Weber, Party for Democracy politician, former Minister of 
Evelyn Matthei, UDI politician, Minister of Labour (2011–) and former Senator
Raúl Rettig, Radical Party politician and jurist

Military and police 
René Schneider Commander in chief of the Chilean Army killed in 1970
Rodolfo Stange Former Chief of the Police Force (Carabineros)
Fernando Matthei Aubel, Frm. General, Air Force Chief

Academics, scientists and writers 
Erik Bongcam-Rudloff, bioinformatician
Juan Brüggen Messtorff, geologist, author
Claudio Bunster Weitzman scientist
Claudio Grossman, lawyer, law professor
Cristián Huneeus, essayist and writer
Pablo Huneeus, sociologist and writer
Marcela Paz, writer
Miguel Kast, Economist
Mathias Klotz, architect
Rodolfo Armando Philippi, paleontologist and zoologist
Max Westenhöfer, scientist, pathologist and biologist
Teodoro Schmidt, engineer and topographer

Artists 
Sigrid Alegría Conrads, actress
Gustavo Becerra-Schmidt, composer, academic
Guillermo Deisler, stage designer and visual poet
Óscar Hahn writer and poet
Hans Helfritz, composer, photographer
Patricio Manns, composer, poet, writer and journalist
Gloria Münchmeyer, actress
Denise Rosenthal, actress and singer
Antonia Zegers, actress

Television and Media 
Karen Doggenweiler TV hostess, journalist
Margot Kahl TV hostess, journalist
Cecilia Bolocco Fonck TV hostess, model, Miss Universe 1987
Diana Bolocco Fonck TV hostess, journalist
Mario Kreutzberger TV personality
Pablo Mackenna Dörr, TV host, poet, writer

Sports people 
Marlene Ahrens athlete
Kristel Köbrich, Chilean swimmer, 2008 Beijing Olympics
Sebastián Keitel athlete
Alex Von Schwedler soccer player
Christiane Endler soccer player
Rainer Wirth footballer
Hans Gildemeister Former Tennis Player
Felipe Aguilar Schuller PGA European Tour golfer
Gert Weil
Joaquín Niemann PGA Tour golfer

Others 
Carlos Anwandter Immigrant, one of the pioneers of the colonization
Uranía Haltenhoff Model and Miss Chile
Rosa Markmann former First Lady of Chile
Paul Schäfer founder of Colonia Dignidad
María Teresa Stange model

See also
German Chilean
Basque Chilean
British Chilean
Croatian Chilean
Ethnic German
French Chilean
Italian Chilean

German
German